Tom or Thomas Cheney may refer to:

Thomas Cheney (c. 1485–1558), Lord Warden of the Cinque Ports
Thomas Cheyney (priest) (1694–1760), Church of England priest
Thomas C. Cheney (1868–1957), Vermont politician and attorney
Thomas Cheney (folklorist) (1901–1993), Mormon folklorist
Tom Cheney (baseball) (1934–2001), pitcher who set the all-time record for strikeouts in a single game
Tom Cheney (cartoonist) (born 1954), cartoonist who writes for The New Yorker and MAD Magazine
Tom Chaney, a character in True Grit